The Rivulet Mill Complex is an historic group of mill buildings located at 60 Rivulet Street, in Uxbridge, Massachusetts, United States. It was originally built by Chandler Taft. Richard Sayles purchased the mill in 1864 and, after repairs, began the manufacture of shoddy, a yarn made from woolen scraps and used clothing. (Richard Sayles was a graduate of the Uxbridge Academy and his family was prominent in Pawtucket, Rhode Island.)  In 1872 the original mill burned and was totally destroyed. Sayles and Zadok Taft rebuilt on site and continued the business under (later) the name of Sayles, Taft & Co. Later still, after Taft retired, the name became the Richard Sayles Mill. The mill was sold out of the Sayles family in 1910.  It was operated by the Uxbridge Worsted Company until the mid-1950s.

In October 1983 the complex was added to the National Register of Historic Places.

See also
National Register of Historic Places listings in Uxbridge, Massachusetts

References

Industrial buildings and structures on the National Register of Historic Places in Massachusetts
Buildings and structures in Uxbridge, Massachusetts
National Register of Historic Places in Uxbridge, Massachusetts